Circle Line or circular line is an expression commonly used to describe a circle route in a public transport network or system.

Circle Line or Circular line may also refer to:

Railways

Asia

Bangladesh 
 Chittagong Circular Railway

China 
Line 2 (Beijing Subway)
Line 10 (Beijing Subway)
Line 4 (Shanghai Metro)
Line 7 (Chengdu Metro)
Line 5 (Zhengzhou Metro)
Loop line (Chongqing Rail Transit)
Line 11 (Guangzhou Metro) (under construction)
Line 3 (Harbin Metro) (partly in operation)
Guiyang railway loop line

Hong Kong 
 MTR Light Rail Routes 705 and 706, also known as Tin Shui Wai Circular.

India 
Delhi Ring Railway
Kolkata Circular Railway
Pink Line (Delhi Metro) (partly in operation)

Japan 
Meijō Line, in Nagoya
Osaka Loop Line, in Osaka
Sapporo Streetcar, in Sapporo
Toei Ōedo Line, in Tokyo
Toyama City Tram Line Route 3, in Toyama
Yamanote Line, in Tokyo

Malaysia 
MRT Circle Line, in Kuala Lumpur

Myanmar 
Yangon Circular Railway

Pakistan 
 Karachi Circular Railway

Singapore 
Circle MRT line

South Korea 
Seoul Subway Line 2

Taiwan 
Circular light rail, in Kaohsiung
Circular line (Taipei Metro)

Thailand 
MRT Blue Line, in Bangkok

Europe

Denmark 
City Circle Line, in Copenhagen

Finland 
Ring Rail Line, in Vantaa (Greater Helsinki)

Germany 
Berlin Ringbahn

Norway 
Ring Line (Oslo)

Poland
 Łódz Circular line, a section of the Łódzka Kolej Aglomeracyjna commuter rail service, Łódz, Poland

Russia 
Bolshaya Koltsevaya line, also known as the Big Circle line, a rapid transit line in Moscow (Line 11)
Koltsevaya line, also called the Circle line, a rapid transit line in Moscow (Line 5)
Moscow Central Circle, an urban/metropolitan rail line around Moscow (Line 14)

Spain 
Line 6 (Madrid Metro)
Line 12 (Madrid Metro)

United Kingdom 
Circle line (London Underground), in London
Cathcart Circle Lines, in Glasgow
Fife Circle Line, in Edinburgh and Fife
Glasgow Subway, in Glasgow

North America

United States 
Chicago 'L' Circle Line proposed but unbuilt

Oceania

Australia 
City Circle, in Sydney
City Circle free tram, in Melbourne
City Circle trains were originally a feature of the City Loop in Melbourne
Inner Circle railway line, in Melbourne
Outer Circle railway line, in Melbourne

Waterways 
United States
Circle Line Downtown, in New York City
Circle Line Sightseeing Cruises, in New York City

Others 

 Circle Line (film), Singaporean film

See also 
 :Category:Railway loop lines
 Ring road or beltway, the circumferential motorway.
 List of ring roads